The Top of the Rockies National Scenic Byway is a National Scenic Byway and Colorado Scenic and Historic Byway located in the high Rocky Mountains of Eagle, Lake, Pitkin, Summit counties, Colorado, United States. The  byway showcases the two highest peaks of the Rocky Mountains: Mount Elbert at elevation  and Mount Massive at elevation . The byway connects with the Collegiate Peaks Scenic Byway at the junction of Colorado State Highway 82 and U.S. Highway 24.

The byway has two northern extensions. The northwestern extension extends from the historic mining town of Leadville over Tennessee Pass to Interstate 70 near Minturn. The northeastern extension extends from Leadville over Fremont Pass to I-70 at Copper Mountain. The two extensions can be driven together as a tour from I-70 to Leadville and back to I-70.

The byway crosses the Continental Divide at Independence Pass at  elevation, Fremont Pass at  elevation, and Tennessee Pass at  elevation. Independence Pass is closed from October to May. The Leadville Historic District is a National Historic Landmark. History Colorado operates the Healy House Museum and Dexter Cabin in Leadville.


Route description

The route then continues north on  through Leadville to Interstate 70 (I-70).

Major intersections

Main route

Fremont Pass route

Gallery

See also

History Colorado
List of scenic byways in Colorado
Scenic byways in the United States

Notes

References

External links

Road Trip on the Top of the Rockies Scenic Byway
America's Scenic Byways: Colorado
Colorado Department of Transportation
Colorado Scenic & Historic Byways Commission
Colorado Scenic & Historic Byways
Colorado Travel Map
Colorado Tourism Office
History Colorado
National Forest Scenic Byways

Colorado Scenic and Historic Byways
National Scenic Byways in Colorado
National Scenic Byways
Transportation in Eagle County, Colorado
Transportation in Lake County, Colorado
Transportation in Pitkin County, Colorado
Transportation in Summit County, Colorado
Tourist attractions in Colorado
Tourist attractions in Eagle County, Colorado
Tourist attractions in Lake County, Colorado
Tourist attractions in Pitkin County, Colorado
Tourist attractions in Summit County, Colorado
Interstate 70
U.S. Route 24